We Can't Be Stopped is a compilation album released by hip hop record label No Limit Records. It was released on December 8, 1998, and was produced by Beats By the Pound members KLC, Mo B. Dick, Craig B. and Carlos Stephens, Meech Wells and Ke'Noe. The album was successful on the charts, selling 110,000 copies in its first week, peaking at #19 on the Billboard 200 and #2 on the Top R&B/Hip-Hop Albums.

Track listing

Charts

Weekly charts

Year-end charts

References

Hip hop compilation albums
Record label compilation albums
1998 compilation albums
No Limit Records compilation albums
Priority Records compilation albums
Gangsta rap compilation albums